Insulin icodec (INN/USAN) is an ultralong-acting basal insulin analogue that was developed by Novo Nordisk. It is currently undergoing Phase 3 trials and expected to be submitted for approval in 2023.  It is administered via subcutaneous injection once weekly to help control the blood sugar level of those with diabetes. It has a duration of action that lasts more than eight days (compared to 42 hours of the previous longest-acting insulin analogue insulin degludec), making it a once-weekly basal insulin.

The substance is composed of two peptide chains, linked by a disulfide bridge. In addition the 21 amino acid residue chain has two internal disulfide bridges and the second chain is 29 residues long.

References 

Insulin therapies